Whitetop is an unincorporated community in Grayson County, Virginia, United States. It is the southern terminus of the Virginia Creeper Trail. Whitetop is named for nearby Whitetop Mountain, the second-tallest independent mountain in the State of Virginia, behind Mount Rogers. The town is about four miles northeast of the North Carolina–Tennessee–Virginia Corners.

References

Unincorporated communities in Virginia
Unincorporated communities in Grayson County, Virginia